The Guinean forest-savanna mosaic is an ecoregion of West Africa, a band of interlaced forest, savanna, and grassland running east to west and dividing the tropical moist forests near the coast from the West Sudanian savanna of the interior.

Setting
The Cameroon Highlands of eastern Nigeria and Cameroon separate the Guinean forest-savanna mosaic from the Northern Congolian forest–savanna mosaic, which lies to the east. The Dahomey Gap is a region of Togo and Benin where the forest-savanna mosaic extends to the coast, and separates the Upper Guinean forests of Guinea, Sierra Leone, Liberia, Côte d'Ivoire, and Ghana from the Lower Guinean forests of Nigeria and Cameroon.

Flora
This region is mainly grassland crossed with trees growing alongside streams and on hillsides, with the constantly occurring fires keeping back the growth of trees in open country. Lophira lanceolata is a tree that is more resistant to fire than many others.

Fauna
The mixture of forest and grassland provide habitat for a range of species from large mammals such as African leopard, forest elephants, hippopotamus and antelopes such as the red-flanked duiker to the common tortoise as well as more localised species including patas monkeys and Ghana worm lizards (Amphisbaenia).

The wetlands in the region are rich in birdlife, including iris glossy starling and black crowned crane.

Human settlement
The ecoregion covers large areas of many West African nations including:
 Senegal - much of the southern Casamance arm of the country including the city of Ziguinchor.
 All of inland Guinea-Bissau
 The Gambia - in particular, south of the River Gambia
 Guinea  - the band of lowland areas parallel to the coast and then running south-east of the central mountains, including the towns of Fria, Kindia and Kissidougou.
 Northern Sierra Leone including the towns of Makeni and Kabala.
 Côte d'Ivoire - a swathe across the middle east from Touba through the country's second-largest city Bouaké.
 A wide strip across Ghana including the country east of Lake Volta, where the main town is Ho.
 Togo - the southern plateau.
 Benin - the southern areas including the city of Bohicon.
 Nigeria - a large area including the cities of Ibadan, which means where the forest meets the savanna, the country's capital Abuja, Lokoja where the River Niger and River Benue meet, Enugu, and Makurdi.

Protected areas
A 2017 assessment found that 107,116 km², or 16%, of the ecoregion is in protected areas. Protected areas include Upper Niger National Park in Guinea, Dulombi-Boe National Park in Guinea-Bissau, Outamba-Kilimi National Park in Sierra Leone, Mont Sangbé National Park in Ivory Coast, Bui National Park and Digya National Park in Ghana, and Old Oyo National Park and Gashaka-Gumti National Park in Nigeria.

External links

References

Afrotropical ecoregions
Ecoregions of Benin
Ecoregions of Burkina Faso
Ecoregions of Cameroon
Ecoregions of the Gambia
Ecoregions of Ghana
Ecoregions of Guinea
Ecoregions of Guinea-Bissau
Ecoregions of Ivory Coast
Ecoregions of Nigeria
Ecoregions of Senegal
Ecoregions of Togo
Forests of Guinea
Grasslands of Benin
Grasslands of Burkina Faso
Grasslands of Cameroon
Grasslands of the Gambia
Grasslands of Ghana
Grasslands of Guinea
Grasslands of Guinea-Bissau
Grasslands of Ivory Coast
Grasslands of Nigeria
Grasslands of Senegal
Grasslands of Togo
Tropical and subtropical grasslands, savannas, and shrublands